Kahal is a settlement in Galilee, Israel.

Kahal may also refer to:

Qahal (קהל), a theocratic organization in ancient Israel, and kahal, a Jewish self-administration council in Eastern Europe 
Kohol (disambiguation), an Iranian name for places and people

See also
Kehilla (disambiguation), a term etymologically related to kahal/qahal
Kagal (disambiguation)